Calum MacRae (born 26 January 1980 in Edinburgh, Scotland) is the defence coach for Benetton. He was head coach of the Scotland rugby 7s team 2014–2017.

Playing career

MacRae played rugby union as a centre and had also operated at fullback and fly-half.

After age grade rugby he played for a four-year period on the IRB Sevens World Series along with playing in the Celtic league for the Borders. He played his final tournament for Scotland at the 2005 RWC Sevens in Hong Kong. Following this he was in Frank Hadden's Scotland Training Squad for a 4-year period, however, MacRae never gained full honours. His international 15's career mainly consisted of three consecutive Churchill Cup Tournaments.

He was called up to the Scotland squad for the autumn tests in 2006 and for the 2008 Six Nations Championship.

In 2009 he signed for Worcester Warriors.

Coaching career

He worked as a skills and attack coach at Newcastle Falcons from June 2011.

In June 2014 it was announced that he would take over as the coach for the Scotland national rugby union 7's team for the 2014–15 season.

In May 2017 he was announced as defence coach for Edinburgh Rugby.

MacRae is a qualified physical education teacher.

References

External links
 profile at Edinburgh Rugby
 

1980 births
Living people
People educated at Earlston High School
Scottish rugby union coaches
Scottish rugby union players
Edinburgh Rugby players
Worcester Warriors players
Venezia Mestre Rugby FC players
Rugby union centres
Rugby union fullbacks
Rugby union fly-halves
Scottish expatriate rugby union players
Expatriate rugby union players in Italy
Scottish expatriate sportspeople in Italy
Border Reivers players
Scotland international rugby sevens players
Scotland 'A' international rugby union players
Male rugby sevens players
Rugby union players from Edinburgh